WCLL-CD, virtual and UHF digital channel 19, is a low-powered, Class A Daystar owned-and-operated television station licensed to Columbus, Ohio, United States. The station is owned by Daystar's parent company, Word of God Fellowship, Inc. Under a channel sharing arrangement, WCLL-CD shares transmission facilities with Bounce TV owned-and-operated station WSFJ-TV on Twin Rivers Drive near downtown Columbus.

History
The station signed on the air on January 11, 1988, as W64BG on channel 64.

References

External links 
Official website

CLL-CD
Daystar (TV network) affiliates
Television channels and stations established in 1988
Low-power television stations in the United States